Torched may refer to:

Torched (album), a Michael Hedges album
Torched (film), a 2004 horror film
Torched, an item that is burnt as the result of arson

See also
Arson (disambiguation)
Torch (disambiguation)